Ashes to Ashes may refer to:

In religion
 "Ashes to ashes, dust to dust", a phrase from the Anglican Book of Common Prayer burial service

In literature
Ashes to Ashes (play), by Harold Pinter, 1996
Ashes to Ashes (book), by Richard Kluger, about smoking in the United States, 1996
Ashes to Ashes (novel), by Tami Hoag, 1999
Ashes to Ashes, by Isabel Ostrander

In films
 Ashes to Ashes (Wednesday Theatre), an Australian television play
 Ashes to Ashes (film), by Wayne Gerard Trotman
 Pumpkinhead: Ashes to Ashes, 2006 made-for-television sequel in the Pumpkinhead franchise of horror films

In television
 Ashes to Ashes (British TV series), a follow-on from the BBC drama Life on Mars
 Ashes to Ashes (South African TV series)
 "Ashes to Ashes" (Only Fools and Horses), an episode of Only Fools and Horses
 "Ashes to Ashes" (Star Trek: Voyager), an episode of Star Trek: Voyager
 "Ashes to Ashes" (CSI: Miami), an episode of CSI: Miami
 Ashes to Ashes (Columbo), a 1998 television movie
 "Ashes to Ashes" (The Originals)

Music

Albums

 Ashes to Ashes (soundtrack album), a soundtrack album of the BBC series
 Ashes to Ashes (David Shankle Group album)
 Ashes to Ashes (Chelsea Grin album), 2014
 Ashes to Ashes (mixtape), a 2010 mixtape released by Rick Ross
 Ashes to Ashes Live, a 2010 DVD by doom metal act Candlemass
 Ashes to Ashes, a 1990 album by Joe Sample

Songs
 "Ashes to Ashes" (The 5th Dimension song), 1973
 "Ashes to Ashes" (David Bowie song), 1980
 "Ashes to Ashes" (Faith No More song), 1997
 "Ashes to Ashes" (Anna Bergendahl song), 2019
 "Asche zu Asche", Ashes to Ashes in English, a song by Rammstein
 "Ashes to Ashes", from Blind Guardian's Somewhere Far Beyond album
 "Ashes to Ashes", a 1991 song by the Norwegian band Apoptygma Berzerk
 "Ashes to Ashes", by Damageplan featuring Jerry Cantrell from The Punisher: The Album
 "Ashes to Ashes", from the Heavenly album Dust to Dust
 "Ashes to Ashes", from the Kamelot album Silverthorn
 "Ashes to Ashes", from the Steve Earle album Jerusalem
 "Ashes to Ashes", from the Tangerine Dream album Electronic Meditation
 "Ashes to Ashes", from the Vinnie Vincent Invasion album All Systems Go

In games
 Ashes to Ashes (Vampire: The Masquerade), a 1991 tabletop role-playing game book

See also
 Ashes 2 Ashes, a story from the Army of Darkness comic spin-off
 Ashes, Ashes (1943 novel), science fiction novel by René Barjavel
 Ashes Ashes, 2002 album by Leiahdorus
 Dust to Dust (disambiguation)
 "Dust in the Wind", a song by Kansas
 Ashes (disambiguation)
 Ash (disambiguation)